The 2005 FIFA Confederations Cup Final was a football match to determine the winners of the 2005 FIFA Confederations Cup. The match was held at Waldstadion, Frankfurt, Germany, on 29 June 2005 and was contested by Brazil and Argentina. Brazil won the match 4–1.

Route to the final

Match details

See also
 Argentina–Brazil football rivalry

References

Final
2005
2005
2005
FIFA Confederations Cup
 
Argentina–Brazil football rivalry
June 2005 sports events in Europe
2000s in Frankfurt
Association football matches in Germany